Julieta is a predominantly Spanish and Portuguese variant of the given name Julia. Notable people with this name include:

Julieta Aranda (born 1975), Mexican artist
Julieta Borghi (born 1982), Argentine volleyball player
Julieta Campos (1932–2007), Cuban-Mexican writer
Julieta Campusano (1918–1991), Chilean politician
Julieta Cantaluppi (born 1985), Italian rhythmic gymnast
Julieta Cardinali (born 1977), Argentine actress
Julieta Castellanos (born 1954), Honduran sociologist
Julieta Castellán (born 1972), Argentine field hockey player
Julieta Dobles (born 1943), Costa Rican poet and writer
Julieta Díaz (born 1977), Argentine model and actress
Julieta Egurrola (born 1953), Mexican actress
Julieta Franco (born 1977), Argentine field hockey player
Julieta Gandra (1917–2007), Portuguese doctor
Julieta Grajales (born 1986), Mexican actress
Julieta Granada (born 1986), Paraguayan golfer
Julieta Jankunas (born 1999), Argentine field hockey player
Julieta Kirkwood (1936–1985), Chilean academic and feminist activist
Julieta Lanteri (1873–1932), Argentine pharmacologist and suffragist
Julieta Lazcano (born 1989), Argentine volleyball player
Julieta Mabel Monje, Bolivian politician
Julieta Marín Torres (1944–2015), Mexican politician
Julieta Norma Fierro Gossman (born 1948), Mexican astrophysicist
Julieta Ortega (born 1972), Argentine actress
Julieta Paredes (born ), Bolivian feminist activist
Julieta Pinto (1921–2022), Costa Rican writer
Julieta Ramírez (born 1974), Argentine rower
Julieta Rosen (born 1962), Mexican actress
Julieta Schildknecht (born 1960), Swiss photographer
Julieta Sciancalepore (born 1987), Argentine dancer
Julieta Serrano (born 1933), Spanish actress
Julieta Szönyi (born 1949), Romanian actress
Julieta Sáenz (born 1954), Mexican gymnast
Julieta Toledo (born 1997), Mexican fencer
Julieta Valero (born 1971), Spanish poet
Julieta Valls Noyes (born 1962), American diplomat
Julieta Venegas (born 1970), American-born Mexican singer
Julieta Zylberberg (born 1983), Argentine actress

See also

Spanish feminine given names